HMS Hector was a UK steam turbine passenger and refrigerated cargo liner launched in 1924. She was the fourth of six civilian ships to bear the name.

In the Second World War Hector was converted into an armed merchant cruiser. She was the eleventh HMS Hector in the history of the Royal Navy.

A Japanese air raid sank her in Ceylon in 1942. In 1946 she was raised and scrapped.

Building
Scotts Shipbuilding and Engineering Company built Hector in Greenock, Scotland. Isobel Cripps launched her on 18 June 1924 and she was completed on 16 September.

Hector was the third of a set of four sister ships built for Alfred Holt and Company of Liverpool, who owned Blue Funnel Line and other shipping lines including the Ocean Steam Ship Company. All were named after characters in Homer's Iliad.

She had a counter stern, slightly raked stem, one funnel and two masts. She had accommodation for first class passengers only.

By 1934 Patroclus had been fitted with wireless direction finding equipment.

Civilian service
Scotts delivered Hector to Blue Funnel on 23 September 1924 and she made her maiden voyage from Liverpool to the Far East on 24 September 1924. This was the regular route for Hector and her three sisters.

Naval service
On 27 August 1939, a few days before the outbreak of the Second World War, the Admiralty requisitioned Hector and had her converted into an armed merchant cruiser. Her primary armament was six BL 6-inch Mk XII naval guns and her secondary armament included two QF 3-inch 20 cwt anti-aircraft guns. Her conversion was completed on 20 December 1939.

Hector served on the New Zealand Station from January to July 1940 and the East Indies Station from August 1940 until February 1942. In March 1942 she was transferred to the Eastern Fleet.

Loss
Hector was dry docked in Colombo in Ceylon to prepare for decommissioning. On 5 April 1942 Japanese carrier-based aircraft attacked the port in the Easter Sunday Raid. The Japanese force had hoped to catch remnants of the Eastern Fleet in harbour, but most of the fleet had left earlier. Japanese aircraft attacked the few targets they could find, one of which was Hector. She was hit by five bombs that set her on fire, and after several hours she sank. The air raid also sank the destroyer  in the harbour.

The Admiralty returned the wreck of Hector to the Ocean Steamship Company on 20 April 1942, but because of the war she was not refloated until 1946. She was judged to be beyond economical repair, and was sold for scrap.

References

Bibliography

  

 

1924 ships
World War II Auxiliary cruisers of the Royal Navy
Cruisers sunk by aircraft
Maritime incidents in April 1942
Ocean liners of the United Kingdom
Ships built on the River Clyde
Ships sunk by Japanese aircraft
Steamships of the United Kingdom
World War II cruisers of the United Kingdom